Lee-over-Sands, is a small coastal hamlet in the Tendring district of Essex, England. It is located close to the mouth of the River Colne into the North Sea and is in the civil parish of St Osyth.

A sandspit called Colne Point is offshore from the hamlet. Colne Point Nature Reserve, a shingle ridge enclosing a saltmarsh, is to the west of the hamlet on the site of a World War I gravel works.

The area is subject to flooding, and was severely affected by the North Sea flood of 1953 when the seawall was breached in many locations near the village. In January 2017 following a threat of coastal flooding, an evacuation of 2,500 homes in Lee-Over-Sands and nearby Jaywick was planned but in the event not required.

A number of houses are on the seaward side of the seawall, on Beach Road. One house on Beach Road won the RIBA East Award 2017 and the RIBA East Small Project Award 2017, and was long-listed for the national RIBA House of the Year award.

References

External links

Blog for residents of Lee-Over-Sands, St Osyth, Essex

Hamlets in Essex
Populated coastal places in Essex
St Osyth